The Hidden Lie (Live in Paris 6/6/86) is a live performance album by the Irish post-punk band Virgin Prunes. It was issued by Baby Records in May 1987.

Track listing

Personnel 

Virgin Prunes
 Mary D'Nellon – guitar, production, mixing
 Gavin Friday – vocals
 Pod – drums
 Strongman – bass guitar, production, mixing

Technical personnel
 Shea Fitz – engineering
 Liz O'Toole – mastering

Release history

References

External links 
 

1987 live albums
Virgin Prunes albums